Dalle de verre, from French: "glass slab", is a glass art technique that uses pieces of coloured glass set in a matrix of concrete and epoxy resin or other supporting material.

Technique
The technique was developed by Jean Gaudin in Paris in the 1930s. The edges of the resulting pieces may be chipped or faceted to increase the refraction and reflection effects.

The pieces are laid out to a design, similar to traditional stained-glass work. The pieces are laid on a bed of sand, bounded by a wooden casting frame. A matrix material, sand and cement or epoxy resin, is poured between the glass pieces and allowed to dry, typically requiring 24 hours to harden. The visible glass faces are then cleaned and the resulting solid panel can be relocated, embedded or hung as required.

The use of thicker glass produces deeper colour effects than traditional lead came stained-glass, especially when illuminated by bright natural or artificial light.

The technique achieved prominence in the stained glass literature of the 1950s and 1960s.

Conservation
Originally, concrete was used as a matrix, which means that older pieces will be structurally unsound and require renovation.  Today, modern technology has created appropriate solutions: An epoxy resin was created with the same expansion rate as the glass. This resin is now used as a matrix instead of concrete.  This has solved all structural issues.

Dalle de verre in the UK
Dalle de verre was brought to the UK by Pierre Fourmaintraux who joined James Powell and Sons (later Whitefriars Glass Studio) in 1956 and trained Dom Charles Norris in the technique. Norris was a Benedictine monk of Buckfast Abbey who went on to become arguably the most prolific British proponent of dalle de verre. His work is incorporated in several Modernist listed Catholic churches.

Other notable dalle de verre artists who have worked in the UK include Gabriel Loire and Henry Haig. The latter designed the narthex windows at Clifton Cathedral.

See also
 Art movement
 Creativity techniques
 List of art media
 List of artistic media
 List of art movements
 List of art techniques
 List of most expensive paintings
 List of most expensive sculptures
 List of sculptors

References

Artistic techniques
Glass art
Stained glass